King Kooba is the duo of producer Matt Harris (DJ Shuff) and Charlie Tate (also known as Colossus).  They are an electronica DJ duo from the United Kingdom. Legend says that they were formed over a pint of beer at Charlie's Mom's pub in London, England. They are currently signed to the Om Records label, and have done work for many of their compilations, such as the Om Lounge series. Their style consists of a mixture of funk, soul, Latin, jazz, and hip hop, with some electronic elements such as synthesizers and drum machines. Some of their music, such as the song "Blue Mosque", are influenced by Middle Eastern.

Their third album, nufoundfunk, released in 2000, was especially well-reviewed. Sharon O'Connell of The Times called it "an impressively savvy swing through neo-funk, ambient house, jazz'n'bass, hip-hop and soul." DJ Magazine called it one of the best of the year.

Discography

Albums
The Imperial Solution - debut LP, released 1998
Enter The Throne Room - released 1999
nufoundfunk - released 2000
Indian Summer - released 2002
The Score - released 2008
Return of The King - released 2021

Remixes
J Boogie's Dubtronic Science
Naked Music NYC
Charlie Parker

Remixes of King Kooba
Michael Tello
Afro-Mystik
Kaskade
Ski Oakenfull

References

External links
Om Records Official Page

British electronic music groups